The soundtrack to the film Rockers was released in 1979.

Track listing

Side One
"We 'A' Rockers" (Ian Lewis, Bernard Harvey) - Inner Circle
"Money Worries" (Wilson) - The Maytones
"Police and Thieves" (Junior Murvin, Lee Perry) - Junior Murvin
"Book of Rules" (Barry Llewellyn, Harry Johnson) - The Heptones
"Stepping Razor" (Joe Higgs) - Peter Tosh
"Tenement Yard" (Jacob Miller, Roger Lewis) - Jacob Miller
"Fade Away" (Earl "Chinna" Smith) - Junior Byles

Side Two
"Rockers" (Neville Livingstone) - Bunny Wailer
"Slave Master" (Gregory Isaacs) - Gregory Isaacs
"Man in the Street" (Coxsone Dodd) - Rockers All Stars
"Graduation in Zion" (Frank Dowding) - Kiddus I
"Jah No Dead" (Winston Rodney) - Burning Spear
"Satta Massagana" (L. Manning, D. Manning, B. Collins) - Third World
"Natty Take Over" (Justin Hines, Michael Roper) - Justin Hines & the Dominoes

Note: Some versions replace "Man in the Street" with "Dread Lion" by Lee Perry & the Upsetters.

Personnel
 Theodoros Bafaloukos - Executive Producer
 Avrom Robin - Executive Producer
 Chris Blackwell - Soundtrack Compilation

Rockers
Rockers
Rockers
Reggae soundtracks